Platyxanthus is a genus of crabs in the family Platyxanthidae, containing the following species:
Platyxanthus balboai Garth, 1940
Platyxanthus crenulatus A. Milne-Edwards, 1879
Platyxanthus orbignyi (H. Milne Edwards & Lucas, 1843)
Platyxanthus patagonicus A. Milne-Edwards, 1879

References

Eriphioidea